The Vampire of Düsseldorf is a 1965 thriller film directed by Robert Hossein. It was joint production between Spain, France and Italy. The film was based on the life and crimes of German serial killer Peter Kürten.

Production
The Vampire of Düsseldorf was shot between September 28, 1964, and December 10, 1964.

Reception
Seeing the film at a preview screening in Paris, "Mosk." of Variety stated that Hossein had "wisely not tried to emulate M and that "Hossein obviously has seen and assimilated many of these pix and does not imitate but takes the ideas and aspects of the times. But this only a moderate suspense item, which may be an okay play-off item on its theme, with arty chances broad chancey."

References

Sources

External links
 

1965 films
1960s thriller films
1960s serial killer films
French thriller films
French serial killer films
Italian serial killer films
Spanish serial killer films
1960s French-language films
Films set in Düsseldorf
Films set in the 1910s
Films set in the 1920s
Films set in the 1930s
Cultural depictions of Peter Kürten
Italian thriller films
Spanish thriller films
1960s French films
1960s Italian films